The 1987 Chilean telethon was the seventh version of the solidarity campaign conducted in Chile, which took place on 4 and 5 December 1987. The theme of this version was "To Believe in Life." The poster boy was Victor Torres.

This Telethon came out after a year's absence. The 1986 edition was suspended due to various reasons.

That year also saw disasters: floods and storms in central Chile, as well as attacks and protests, but again that did not stop the exceeding of the target in 1985: $ 502,293,311.

Justifications for the suspension of the 1986 edition 

 First, 1986 saw changes to the Teletón's administration.
 The second reason is due to time constraints related to Don Francisco, host of the Chilean Teletón. This was because its main show, Sábado Gigante (which had already 24 years in Canal 13), would be exported to Spanish International Network (later Univision) in the United States, and since 2 editions had to be produced in one week (1 for each network), less time was left for Don Francisco's other projects, the Teletón included.
 The third and final reason is due to the events in that year, which included the disasters mentioned above, and the hosting of the 1986 South American Games.

Sponsors

Artists

Nationals 
  Los Huasos Quincheros
  Irene Llano
  Miguel Piñera
  Pancho Puelma
  Zalo Reyes
  Miguelo
  Cristóbal
  Luis Dimas
  Myriam Hernández
  Luis Jara
  Patricia Maldonado
  Eduardo Gatti
  Jorge Eduardo
  Luz Eliana
  Patricio Renán
  Santiago Cuatro
  Patricia Frías
  José Luis Arce
  Ginette Acevedo
  Roberto Viking Valdés
  Sergio Lillo
  Maria Inés Naveillán
  Soledad Guerrero
  Analyo
  Mónica De Calixto
  Sonora de Tommy Rey
  Peter Rock
  Gloria Simonetti
  Wildo
  Las Cuatro Brujas
  Alberto Plaza
  Andrea Tessa
  José Alfredo Fuentes
  Juan Carlos Duque

International Artists 
  Sandra Mihanovich
  Olé Olé
  Celeste Carvallo
  Jairo
  Silvana Di Lorenzo
  Alejandro Lerner
  Alfredo De Angelis
  Rubén Juárez
  Pablito Ruiz
  Oscar De Fontana
  Fito Páez
  Juka Shepp
  Manuela Bravo
  Braulio
  Claudio
  Hernaldo Zúñiga
  José Luis Rodríguez "El Puma"
  Pedro Prado
  Mónica Posse

Comedians 
 Coco Legrand
 Jorge "Chino" Navarrete
 Canelo Huanca
 Checho Hirane
 Gigi Martin
 Luis Arenas
 Ernesto Ruiz
 Jappening Con Ja

In the Children's Section 
 A recording of children's programmes of the time were broadcast.

Transmission 
As with previous years, the Teletón was broadcast through all of the TV networks existing back then in Chile.
 Telenorte
 UCV Televisión
 Televisión Nacional de Chile
 Universidad de Chile Televisión
 Universidad Católica de Chile Televisión
However, this edition marked the debut of Canal 9, the secondary channel of Televisión Nacional de Chile, which began its experimental transmissions in 1986.

External links 
 1987 Chilean telethon (closing)
 La Cuarta - Condenan a ex símbolo de la Teletón

Telethon
Chilean telethons